Operation Shmenti Capelli is a 2011 Bulgarian drama film directed by Ivan Mitov.

Cast
 Hari Anichkin as General Gospodinov
 Zahari Baharov as Tatko
 Kiril Efremov as Botora
 Vladislav Karamfilov as Karaduro
 Malin Krastev as Nadejdev
 Rosica Litova as Kalinka
 Plamen Peev as Totsev
 Georgi Penkov as Psychiatrist
 Hristo Shopov as Lyubev
 Stefan Shterev as Gipsa
 Konstantin Slavov as Shopa
 Georgi Stoev as Psychiatrist
 Kitodar Todorov as Verev
 Vladimir Vladimirov as Litseto X

References

External links
 

2011 films
2010s Bulgarian-language films
2011 drama films
Films shot in Bulgaria
Bulgarian drama films